Gerard Francis Conway (born September 10, 1952) is an American comic book writer, comic book editor, screenwriter, television writer, and television producer. He is known for co-creating the Marvel Comics vigilante antihero the Punisher as well as the Scarlet Spider (Ben Reilly), and the first Ms. Marvel, and also  scripting the death of the character Gwen Stacy during his long run on The Amazing Spider-Man. At DC Comics, he is known for co-creating the superheroes Firestorm and Power Girl, the character Jason Todd and the villain Killer Croc, and for writing the Justice League of America for eight years. Conway wrote the first major, modern-day intercompany crossover, Superman vs. the Amazing Spider-Man.

Early life
Born in Brooklyn, New York, New York, Conway grew up a comic fan; a letter from him appears in Fantastic Four #50 (May 1966), written when Conway was 13.

He attended New York University for a time.

Career
He published his first professional comic book work at 16, with the 6-page horror story "Aaron Philips' Photo Finish" in DC Comics' House of Secrets #81 (Sept. 1969). He continued selling such anthological stories for that series and for Marvel's Chamber of Darkness and Tower of Shadows through the end of 1970, by which time he had also published one-page text short stories in DC's All-Star Western #1 (Sept. 1970) and Super DC Giant #S-14 (Oct. 1970). He published his first continuing-character story in DC's semi-anthological occult comic The Phantom Stranger #10 (Dec. 1970).

Conway recalled breaking into Marvel Comics through Marvel editor Roy Thomas:

Following his first continuing-character story for Marvel, with his script for the jungle lord Ka-Zar in Astonishing Tales #3 (Dec. 1970), Conway began writing superhero stories with Daredevil #72 (Jan. 1971). He quickly went on to assignments on Iron Man, The Incredible Hulk, and both "The Inhumans" and "The Black Widow" features in the split book Amazing Adventures. He scripted the first Man-Thing story, in 1971, sharing co-creation credit with Stan Lee and Roy Thomas. Conway eventually scripted virtually every major Marvel title, and co-created (with writers Roy & Jean Thomas and artist Mike Ploog) the lycanthropic lead character of the feature "Werewolf by Night", in Marvel Spotlight #2 (Feb. 1972); he also wrote the premiere issue of Marvel's The Tomb of Dracula, introducing the longstanding literary vampire into the Marvel universe.

Spider-Man and intercompany rotation
At 19, Conway began scripting The Amazing Spider-Man, succeeding Stan Lee as writer of one of Marvel's flagship titles. His run, from issues #111–149 (August 1972 – October 1975), included the landmark death of Gwen Stacy story in #121 (June 1973). Eight issues later, Conway and Andru introduced the Punisher as a conflicted antagonist for Spider-Man, as well as the Jackal. The Punisher became a popular star of numerous comic books and has been adapted into three movies and a live action television series. Conway additionally wrote Fantastic Four, from #133–152 (April 1973 – Nov. 1974).

Conway in 2009 reflected on writing flagship Marvel characters at a very young age:

In late 1972, Conway and writers Steve Englehart and Len Wein crafted a metafictional unofficial crossover spanning titles from both major comics companies. Each comic featured Englehart, Conway, and Wein, as well as Wein's first wife Glynis, interacting with Marvel or DC characters at the Rutland Halloween Parade in Rutland, Vermont. Beginning in Amazing Adventures #16 (by Englehart with art by Bob Brown and Frank McLaughlin), the story continued in Justice League of America #103 (by Wein, Dick Dillin and Dick Giordano), and concluded in Thor #207 (by Conway and penciler John Buscema). As Englehart explained in 2010, "It certainly seemed like a radical concept and we knew that we had to be subtle (laughs) and each story had to stand on its own, but we really worked it out. It's really worthwhile to read those stories back to back to back – it didn't matter to us that one was at DC and two were at Marvel – I think it was us being creative, thinking what would be really cool to do."

Conway returned to DC Comics in mid-1975, beginning with three books cover-dated Nov. 1975: Hercules Unbound #1, Kong the Untamed #3, and Swamp Thing #19. He wrote a revival of the Golden Age comic book series All Star Comics which introduced the character Power Girl. Shortly afterward, he was chosen by Marvel and DC editors to script the historic intercompany crossover Superman vs. the Amazing Spider-Man #1, a 96-page, tabloid-sized, $2 one-shot, at a time when comic books sold for 25 cents.

He continued writing for DC, on titles including Superman, Detective Comics (starring Batman), Metal Men, Justice League of America, 1st Issue Special #11 starring Codename: Assassin, and that of the licensed character Tarzan. Conway briefly returned to Marvel where he succeeded Marv Wolfman as editor-in-chief in March 1976, but held the job only "about a month-and-a-half," relinquishing the post and being succeeded by Archie Goodwin.

For a time, a confluence of publishing schedules resulted in Conway stories appearing in both Marvel and DC comics in the same month: The prolific Conway's comic books with January 1977 cover-dates alone, for example, are Marvel's The Avengers, The Defenders, Captain Marvel, Iron Man, The Spectacular Spider-Man, and the premiere issues of Ms. Marvel and Logan's Run, and Superman and Action Comics.

DC Comics and later career

After leaving Marvel's editorship, he again wrote exclusively for DC for the next decade writing both major and lesser titles – from those featuring Superman, Wonder Woman, and the Legion of Super-Heroes to such books as Weird Western Tales, Atari Force and Sun Devils. He had an eight-year run on Justice League of America, writing most issues from #151–255 (Feb. 1978 – Oct. 1986) including the double-sized anniversary issue #200 (March 1982). Conway wrote two additional Superman projects in the oversized tabloid format, Superman vs. Wonder Woman, drawn by José Luis García-López, and Superman vs. Shazam, drawn by Rich Buckler.

He co-created the characters Firestorm with artist Al Milgrom and Steel, the Indestructible Man with artist Don Heck in the premiere issues (both March 1978) of the respective titular comics. Two other Conway co-creations, the Deserter (with artist Dick Ayers) and the Vixen (with artist Bob Oksner) were scheduled to receive their own series as well but were canceled before any issues were published. He additionally co-created the characters Vibe and Gypsy. As writer of Batman #337–359 (July 1981 – May 1983) and the feature "Batman" in Detective Comics #497–526 (Dec. 1980 – May 1983), he introduced the characters Killer Croc and Jason Todd, the latter of whom became the second Robin, succeeding original sidekick Dick Grayson. With artist Gene Colan, Conway revived the Golden Age supervillains Doctor Death in Batman #345 (March 1982) and the Monk in Batman #350 (Aug. 1982).

Conway was a frequent collaborator with Roy Thomas. Together they wrote a two-part Superman–Captain Marvel team-up in DC Comics Presents #33–34 (May–June 1981); the Atari Force and Swordquest mini-comics packaged with Atari 2600 video games; and three Justice League of America-Justice Society of America crossovers. Conway contributed ideas to the talking animal comic Captain Carrot and His Amazing Zoo Crew!, created by Thomas and Scott Shaw. Thomas and Conway were to be the co-writers of the JLA/Avengers intercompany crossover, but editorial disputes between DC and Marvel caused the project's cancellation. Conway was one of the contributors to the DC Challenge limited series in 1986.

He returned to Marvel in the 1980s and served as the regular writer of both The Spectacular Spider-Man and Web of Spider-Man from 1988 until 1990. Conway stated in 1991 that "I understand the character a lot better now than I did when I was nineteen. And one of the nice things about the Marvel characters is that you can keep them fresh by changing them just a bit." His run on Spectacular included such story arcs as the "Lobo Brothers Gang War". He relinquished writing duties on both titles when he became the story editor of the television series Father Dowling Mysteries. Conway's last recorded comic credits for many years were Topps Comics' "Kirbyverse" NightGlider #1 (April 1993), scripting from a Roy Thomas plot, and a story for Disney Adventures, published in 1995.

Conway returned to comics in 2009 and wrote DC Comics' The Last Days of Animal Man, with artist Chris Batista. In 2011, he wrote the DC Retroactive: Justice League – The '80s one-shot. Also for DC, he wrote the Firestorm feature in Legends of Tomorrow #1–6 in 2016.

In 2015, he returned to Spider-Man by writing a story in Spider-Verse Team Up #2, and the "Spiral" storyline in The Amazing Spider-Man #16.1–20.1. He returned to work as a series' regular writer that same year with Carnage which ran for 16 issues until 2017. In 2016, he returned to his creation the Punisher by writing The Punisher Annual #1. From 2016 to 2017, he wrote The Amazing Spider-Man: Renew Your Vows #1–9, followed by What If? Spider-Man #1 in 2018 and the oneshot The Amazing Spider-Man: Going Big, penciled by Mark Bagley, in 2019.

Books, comic strips, screenplays
In addition to comics, Conway published two science-fiction novels: The Midnight Dancers and Mindship (originally published as a short story in the science fiction anthology "Universe 1.") He also wrote the February 14–December 3, 1983 dailies of the syndicated newspaper comic strip Star Trek, based upon the 1960s TV series.

Conway as well moved into screenwriting in the 1980s, starting with the animated feature Fire and Ice (1983), co-written with Roy Thomas, based on characters created by Ralph Bakshi and Frank Frazetta. Conway and Thomas wrote the story basis for Stanley Mann's screenplay for the film Conan the Destroyer (1984). Afterwards, Conway and Thomas also worked on the script of a live-action X-Men film for production company Nelvana that wasn't produced because of distributor Orion Pictures' financial troubles and subsequent bankruptcy.

Conway wrote, and later produced, such TV series as Father Dowling Mysteries, Diagnosis: Murder, Matlock, Jake and the Fatman, Hercules: The Legendary Journeys, Baywatch Nights, Pacific Blue, Silk Stalkings, Perry Mason telefilms, Law & Order, The Huntress, Law & Order: Criminal Intent, and an episode of Batman: The Animated Series ("Appointment in Crime Alley"). Conway frequently referenced his comic book connections during his stint on Law & Order by naming characters on the show after comic book creators such as John Byrne.

Personal life
Conway's first wife was comic-book writer Carla Conway. The couple have a daughter, Cara. His second wife, Karen, is a psychologist who works with autistic children. They married in 1992 and have a daughter, Rachel. As of 2015, he and his wife Laura live in Thousand Oaks, California.

Conway's ancestral family background is Irish, as he described in his blog:

Conway was raised a Christian, but stated in a 2013 interview that he does not "have any religious belief at this point".

Comics bibliography

Atlas/Seaboard Comics
 Destructor #4 (1975)
 Targitt #3 (1975)
 Tiger-Man #2–3 (1975)

DC Comics

 1st Issue Special #11–13 (1976)
 Action Comics #457, 467, 477–479, 486, 517–523 (1976–1981)
 Adventure Comics #444, 459–460, 463–464 (1976–1979)
 All-New Collectors' Edition #C-54, C-58 (1978)
 All Star Comics #58–62 (1976)
 All-Star Squadron #8–9 (1982)
 The Amazing World of DC Comics #11 (1976)
 Arak, Son of Thunder #7 (1982)
 Atari Force #1–5 (1982–1983)
 Atari Force vol. 2 #1–13 (1984–1985)
 Batman #295, 305–306, 337–346, 348–359 (1978–1983)
 Batman Family #17 (1978)
 The Brave and the Bold #158, 161, 171–174 (1980–1981)
 Cancelled Comic Cavalcade #1–2 (1978)
 Challengers of the Unknown #81–87 (1977–1978)
 Cinder and Ashe #1–4 (1988)
 DC Challenge #8, 12 (1986)
 DC Comics Presents #17–18, 21, 30–33, 40, 45, 53, 68 (1980–1984)
 DC Retroactive: Justice League of America - The '80s #1 (2011)
 DC Special #28 (1977)
 DC Special Blue Ribbon Digest #5 (1980)
 DC Special Series #1, 6, 10, 16 (1977–1978)
 DC Super-Stars #18 (1978)
 Detective Comics #463–464, 497–499, 501–513, 515–526 (1976–1983)
 Doorway to Nightmare #2 (1978)
 Firestorm #1–5 (1978)
 The Flash #289–299, 301–304 (Firestorm backup stories) (1980–1981)
 Forbidden Tales of Dark Mansion #8 (1972)
 Freedom Fighters #1–2 (1976)
 The Fury of Firestorm #1–53, 100 Annual #1–4 (1982–1986, 1990)
 Hercules Unbound #1–6 (1975–1976)
 Heroes Against Hunger #1 (1986)
 House of Mystery #188, 193, 196, 199–200, 202, 292–294, 296–297, 300 (1970–1982)
 House of Secrets #81, 83, 85–86, 88–89, 94, 111–112, 140, 150 (1969–1978)
 House of Secrets: The Bronze Age Omnibus Vol. 2 (story "Night of the Rat", originally intended for publication in House of Secrets #141) (2019)
 Jonah Hex #40–41, 45–47 (1980–1981)
 Justice League of America #125–127, 131–134, 151–216, 219, 221–223, 228–230, 233–239, 241–255, Annual #2 (1975–1986)
 Kamandi #39–44 (1976)
 Kong the Untamed #3–5 (1975–1976)
 Last Days of Animal Man #1–6 (2009)
 Legends of Tomorrow #1–6 (Firestorm feature) (2016)
 Legion of Super-Heroes vol. 2 #259–278 (1980–1981)
 Man-Bat #1 (1975)
 Metal Men #46–48, 54–56 (1976–1978)
 Mystery in Space #114 (1980)
 New Gods #12–19 (1977–1978)
 The New Teen Titans #16 (Captain Carrot and His Amazing Zoo Crew! insert) (1982)
 Phantom Stranger vol. 2 #10–11 (1970–1971)
 Secret Hearts #143, 147, 149 (1970–1971)
 Secret Origins vol. 2 #4, 17 (1986–1987)
 Secret Society of Super Villains #1–2, 8–14 (1976–1978)
 Star Spangled War Stories #193 (1975)
 Steel, The Indestructible Man #1–5 (1978)
 Sun Devils #1–9 (1984–1985)
 Super-Team Family #11–15 (1977–1978)
 Superboy and the Legion of Super-Heroes #227, 232, 234–235, 248–249, 252–258 (1977–1979)
 Superman #301, 303–304, 307–309, 345–348, 350–351, 407 (1976–1985)
 The Superman Family #175, 184, 186–193, 195–202, 206–211 (1976–1981)
 Swamp Thing #19–20, 23–24 (1975–1976)
 Swordquest #1–3 (1982)
 Tarzan #250–254 (1976)
 The Unexpected #221 (1982)
 Weird Western Tales #45–58, 60–70 (Scalphunter feature) (1978–1980)
 The Witching Hour #10, 14, 27, 38 (1970–1974)
 Wonder Woman #233–241, 259–285, 329 (1977–1986)
 World's Finest Comics #245–254, 256–259, 261–262, 268–270, 272, 274–275 (1977–1982)
 Young Love #122 (1976)
 Zatanna Special #1 (1987)

DC Comics and Marvel Comics
 Superman vs. the Amazing Spider-Man #1 (1976)

Disney Comics
 Disney Adventures v5 #4 (1995)

Eclipse Comics
 The Unknown Worlds of Frank Brunner #2 (1985)

First Comics
 Hawkmoon: The Jewel in the Skull #1–4 (1986)
 Hawkmoon: The Mad God's Amulet #1–4 (1987)

Marvel Comics

 Adventure into Fear #10 (1972)
 Amazing Adventures #7, 9–11, 18–19 (1971–1973)
 The Amazing Spider-Man #111–149 (1972–1975), Annual #23 (1989)
 The Amazing Spider-Man vol. 3 #16.1–20.1 (2015)
 The Amazing Spider-Man: Going Big #1 (2019)
 The Amazing Spider-Man: Renew Your Vows #1–9 (2016–2017)
 Astonishing Tales #3–8 (1970–1971)
 The Avengers #151–157, Annual #6 (1976–1977)
 Black Widow the Coldest War GN (1990)
 Captain America #149–152 (1972)
 Captain Marvel #22, 47–48 (1972–1977)
 Carnage #1–16 (2015–2017)
 Chamber of Chills #1 (1972)
 Chamber of Darkness #3 (1970)
 Conan the Barbarian #226–231 (1989–1990)
 Creatures on the Loose #18 (1972)
 Daredevil #72–98, 118 (1971–1975)
 Daredevil Annual #5 (1989)
 Deadly Hands of Kung Fu #1, 3–4 (1974)
 Defenders #42–45, 57 (1976–1978)
 Dracula Lives #1, 3–5, 7, 9, 12–13 (1973–1975)
 Fantastic Four #134–152, 179 (1973–1977)
 Ghost Rider #21–23 (1976–1977)
 Giant-Size Fantastic Four #2–3 (1974)
 Giant-Size Spider-Man #3–5 (1975)
 Giant-Size Super-Heroes #1 (Spider-Man) (1974)
 Giant-Size Super-Stars #1 (Fantastic Four) (1974)
 Haunt of Horror #1–2, 4 (1974)
 The Incredible Hulk #146–147 (1971–1972)
 Iron Man #35–44, 91–97 (1971–1977)
 Justice #9–11, 13 (1987)
 Ka-Zar vol. 2 #6–10 (1974–1975)
 Kull and the Barbarians #2 (1975)
 Kull the Conqueror #4–7, 9–10 (1972–1973)
 Legion of Monsters #1 (1975)
 Logan's Run #1 (1977)
 Marvel Comics #1000 (2019)
 Marvel Comics Presents #101–109 (1992)
 Marvel Graphic Novel: Conan:The Horn of Azoth GN (1990)
 Marvel Graphic Novel: The Amazing Spider-Man: Parallel Lives GN (1989)
 Marvel Point One #1 (Carnage) (2015)
 Marvel Preview #2 (1975)
 Marvel Spotlight #2–4 (1972)
 Marvel Super-Heroes vol. 2 #4 (1990)
 Marvel Team-Up #2–12, 28–37, 52 (1972–1976)
 Monsters on the Prowl #13 (1971)
 Monsters Unleashed #1–2, 6–7, 11 (1973–1975)
 Ms. Marvel #1–2 (1977)
 Our Love Story #15 (1972)
 Planet of the Apes #1 (1974)
 The Punisher Annual #1 (2016)
 Punisher Bloodlines #1 (1992)
 Savage Sword of Conan #166–169, 174 (1989–1990)
 Savage Tales #2, 6–10 (1973–1975)
 Sgt. Fury and his Howling Commandos #86, 117–119 (1971–1974)
 The Spectacular Spider-Man #1–3, 137–174, Annual #8–11 (1976–1977, 1988–1991)
 Spider-Man/Dr. Strange: The Way to Dusty Death #1 (1993)
 Spider-Man: Fear Itself GN (1992)
 Spider-Verse Team-Up #2 (2015)
 Spitfire and the Troubleshooters #1–6 (1986–1987)
 Sub-Mariner #41–49 (1971–1972)
 Tales of the Zombie #4, 10 (1974–1975)
 Thor #193–238 (1971–1975)
 ThunderCats #7–12, 24 (1986–1988)
 The Tomb of Dracula #1–2 (1972)
 Tower of Shadows #5 (1970)
 Unknown Worlds of Science Fiction #1–4 (1975)
 Vampire Tales #3, 8–10 (1974–1975)
 Visionaries #3–6 (1988)
 Web of Spider-Man #35–36, 47–48, 50–70, Annual #5–6 (1988–1990)
 Werewolf by Night #1–4, 9–10 (1972–1973)
 What If Spider-Man #1 (2018)
 Worlds Unknown #1–2, 4, 6 (1973–1974)

Papercutz
 Nancy Drew: Girl Detective - The New Case Files #3 ("Together with the Hardy Boys") (2011)

Skywald Publications
 Nightmare #3 (1971)

Topps Comics
 NightGlider #1 (1993)

Warren Publications
 Creepy #38, 103 (1971–1978)
 Eerie #32 (1971)

Television and film credits

Television
 G.I. Joe: A Real American Hero (1985–1986)
 The Transformers (1986)
 The Centurions (1986)
 My Little Pony (1986–1987)
 Dinosaucers (1987)
 Spiral Zone (1987)
 Dino-Riders (1988)
 Monsters (1990)
 Father Dowling Mysteries (1990–1991)
 Jake and the Fatman (1992)
 Perry Mason: The Case of the Heartbroken Bride (TV movie) (1992)
 Matlock (1992–1993)
 Batman: The Animated Series (1992, 1994)
 Diagnosis: Murder (1993–1997)
 Diagnosis: Murder - A Twist of the Knife (TV movie) (1993)
 Perry Mason: The Case of the Killer Kiss (TV Movie) (1993)
 Spider-Man (1994)
 A Perry Mason Mystery: The Case of the Jealous Jokester (TV movie) (1995)
 Two (1996)
 Pacific Blue (1996)
 Silk Stalkings (1996, 1998)
 Players (1997)
 Baywatch Nights (1997)
 Hercules: The Legendary Journeys (1998–1999)
 Law & Order (1999–2000)
 The Huntress (2000)
 Law & Order: Criminal Intent (2003–2006)

Feature films
 Fire and Ice (1983)
 Conan the Destroyer (1984)

References

External links

 A Conversation with Gerry Conway (Comic Geek Speak: Episode 701, Podcast)
 
 "DC Profiles #36: Gerry Conway" at the Grand Comics Database
 
 Gerry Conway interview at Fantastic Four Headquarters
 Gerry Conway at Mike's Amazing World of Comics
 Gerry Conway at the Unofficial Handbook of Marvel Comics Creators
 Women in Refrigerators: "Gerry Conway Responds"
 The New York Times- Movies: Gerry Conway

1952 births
20th-century American screenwriters
21st-century American writers
American comics writers
American television writers
American male television writers
American people of Irish descent
Comic book editors
Inkpot Award winners
Living people
Marvel Comics editors-in-chief
Marvel Comics writers
Marvel Comics people
DC Comics people
Writers from Brooklyn
Screenwriters from New York (state)
20th-century American male writers